Jaryd Russell Lazar, better known as summit1g, is an American Twitch streamer and former professional Counter-Strike: Global Offensive player. After retiring from competitive esports, Lazar became a well-known streamer on Twitch by streaming CS:GO and WarZ. He currently streams a variety of video games, such as Escape from Tarkov, Grand Theft Auto V, Sea of Thieves, Overwatch, DayZ, iRacing, Foxhole,  Hearthstone and Rust.

Streaming on Twitch

In 2017, Lazar garnered widespread attention for surpassing Tom "Syndicate" Cassell's number of followers on Twitch. In 2018, Lazar's became the most-followed channel on the platform, surpassing Riot Games.

In May 2018, Lazar streamed gameplay with YouTuber Jake Paul and received complaints and criticism from fans due to Paul's recent controversial behavior. Lazar told viewers, "I'm a little disappointed in chat. I had hoped the 1g squad to be a little bit different. I thought some people had a little bit thicker skin."

In April 2020, Lazar made comments about Valorant, a free-to-play multiplayer tactical first-person shooter developed by Riot Games. He claimed the game's closed beta was poorly managed, and that other streamers had manipulated Twitch's "Drops" system to receive game keys, giving them access to the closed beta to increase their viewer counts and the game's total number of viewers. He later apologized on Twitter, then subsequently deleted the apology.

In May 2020, Lazar signed a multi-year contract with Twitch to provide content and partnership support. As of December 9, 2021, he has over 6 million Twitch followers, and is ranked its 17th most popular streamer.

As of July 2021, Lazar has regularly speedrun Max Payne 3 during his Twitch streams. He achieved a world record in its "Hardcore" category while streaming live on July 2, 2021.

Awards and nominations

See also
List of most-followed Twitch channels

References

American esports players
Living people
Counter-Strike players
Twitch (service) streamers
1987 births